The 2017–18 College of Charleston Cougars men's basketball team represented the College of Charleston during the 2017–18 NCAA Division I men's basketball season. The Cougars, led by fourth-year head coach Earl Grant, played their home games at the TD Arena in Charleston, South Carolina as members of the Colonial Athletic Association. They finished the season 26–8, 14–4 in CAA play to share the regular season title with Northeastern. At the CAA tournament they defeated Drexel, William & Mary, and Northeastern to become CAA Tournament champions. They earned the CAA's automatic bid to the NCAA tournament where they lost in the first round to Auburn.

Previous season
The Cougars finished the 2016–17 season 25–10, 14–4 in CAA play to finish in second place. In the CAA tournament, they defeated James Madison in the quarterfinals and Towson in the semifinals, before losing to UNC Wilmington in the championship game. They were then invited to participate in the NIT, where they lost to Colorado State in the first round.

Offseason

Departures

2017 recruiting class

Preseason 
In a poll of league coaches, media relations directors, and media members at the CAA's media day, the Cougars were picked to finish atop the CAA. Junior forward Jarrell Brantley and senior guard Joe Chealey were named to the preseason All-CAA first team, while sophomore guard Grant Riller was named to the preseason All-CAA second team. r

Roster

Schedule and results

|-
!colspan=12 style=| Exhibition

|-
!colspan=12 style=| Non-conference regular season
|-

|-
!colspan=12 style=| CAA regular season

|-
!colspan=12 style=| CAA tournament

|-
!colspan=12 style=| NCAA tournament

|-

Source

See also
2017–18 College of Charleston Cougars women's basketball team

References

College of Charleston Cougars men's basketball seasons
College of Charleston
College of Charleston